Qarahjah Veran-e Sofla (also Romanized as Qarahjah Verān-e Soflá; also known as Qarah Chahverān-e Soflá) is a village in Chaldoran-e Jonubi Rural District, in the Central District of Chaldoran County, West Azerbaijan Province, Iran. At the 2006 census, its population was 679, in 113 families.

References 

Populated places in Chaldoran County